Tillberga IK is a sports club in Tillberga in Västerås Municipality, Sweden. Tillberga IK was founded on 8 February 1930 and had a number of sections within one club until 1998. At the annual meeting that year, it was decided to split the club up, so that each section would be its own club legally, but all as members of the "Tillberga IK Alliansen" as an umbrella organisation.

The men's bandy team has played in the Swedish top division during the 21st century.

Sections
Tillberga IK Bandy, bandy
Tillberga IK Fotboll, association football
Tillberga IK Handboll, handball
Tillberga IK Innebandy, floorball

References 

Multi-sport clubs in Sweden
Sports clubs established in 1930
1930 establishments in Sweden
Football clubs in Västmanland County
Swedish floorball teams
Swedish handball clubs